Ramappa Engineering College is an engineering college located in the historical district of Warangal in Telangana State, India. It is affiliated with Jawaharlal Nehru Technological University, Hyderabad  with NBA accreditation.

Ramappa Engineering College is named after the Ramappa temple located in Warangal district. The college started in 1999 with majors in Computer Science and Information Technology (CSIT), Computer Science Engineering (CSE) and Electronics and Communications Engineering (ECE) with 60 seats each.

It now has four majors CSIT, CSE, ECE and newly added Electronics and Electrical Engineering (EEE), Mechanical Engineering(MECH), Civil Engineering (CIV).

The college has shifted from Mahabubabad to  Hanamkonda Hunter Road at Warangal District.

See also 
Education in India
Literacy in India
List of institutions of higher education in Telangana

References

External links

Engineering colleges in Telangana
Education in Warangal
1999 establishments in Andhra Pradesh
Educational institutions established in 1999